Vanessa Angélica Villarreal (born in Rio Grande Valley) is a bilingual American poet, essayist, and cultural critic of Mexican descent, whose work focuses on first-generation immigrant experience, pop culture, hybrid experimental and visual poetry, and transnational feminist documentary poetics.

She is a recipient of a 2021 National Endowment for the Arts Fellowship in Creative Writing and in 2019, she won a Whiting Award for poetry. She was also a 2019 Kate Tufts Discovery Award finalist for her book, Beast Meridian (Noemi Press, Akrilica Series, 2017).

She is a CantoMundo Fellow and is pursuing her doctorate in English Literature and Creative Writing at the University of Southern California. She was a mentor for PEN Emerging Voices 2020.

Her work has appeared in major media outlets and magazines including The Cut, Oxford American, The Academy of American Poets, POETRY magazine, Harper's Bazaar, BuzzFeed, The Boston Review, and The New York Times, among others.

Education and early life 
Vanessa Angélica Villarreal was born in McAllen, Texas to a mixed-status Mexican immigrant family, and descendants of indigenous cotton laborers in Northern Mexico. She moved to Houston, Texas at five years old, where her maternal grandmother could receive no-cost medical care for cervical cancer at MD Anderson Cancer Center. Her mother is a florist, and her father Gilberto Villarreal is a rock in español and cumbia guitarist who has played with bands such as Canela India, Los Super Villahnos, Fito Olivares, Sabiduria Norteña, Rolando Becerra, and others. Her family are notable influences on her life and work. The death of her maternal grandmother, and her experiences of racist, sexist, and homophobic discrimination in the Texas public school system, led to troubled preteen and adolescent years and psychiatric hospitalization, which she writes about in her award-winning book, Beast Meridian (Noemi Press, Akrilica Series, 2017). 

She is a first-generation college student, attending the University of Houston and several community colleges from 2000-2011 while working multiple retail and food service jobs. She graduated summa cum laude in 2011. She received her Master of Fine Arts in Creative Writing in 2014 from the University of Colorado at Boulder, and is currently pursuing her doctorate in Literature and Creative Writing from the University of Southern California.

Career and writing 
Vanessa Angélica Villarreal's writing is noted for its experimental, visual, and hybrid forms, including multimedia performances and video. She attributes her experimentation to growing up in a bilingual Mexican/American household among working-class musicians and immigrants in Houston and the borderlands. Her work uses the language of institutional and state and documents, archives, music, pop culture, science, and medicine to restore land and memory to its state before the colonial encounter, reanimate the ghosts of migration, and interrogate medical, state, and intimate state violence. She is "interested in what can be found, animated, and restored in the remains of violence, and how poetry and language can record the fragments of survivor-memory and fill the spaces between documents, photos, artifacts, and objects." In 2019, the Whiting Award Selection Committee wrote of her work, "The poems of Vanessa Angélica Villarreal transport readers into a wilderness, a porous border world of dual (or multiple) identities. Visually striking, rooted in the borderlands, Beast Meridian is a fiercely feminist book that refuses easy closure and answers. The lines blaze with anger and empathy, and the craft astonishes. Beast Meridian will serve as an example of what’s possible in American poetry in the twenty-first century. In a word: gorgeous."

She is also an essayist and cultural critic, and has published criticism and personal essays with a feminist and critical race lens on RuPaul's Drag Race, VIDA, Selena: The Series, and The Witcher 3:Wild Hunt. Her essay and cultural criticism collection on race, gender, and fantasy is forthcoming in 2023 from Tiny Reparations Books, an imprint of Plume/Dutton and Penguin Random House.

Personal life 
Villarreal is a single mother and doctoral student currently living in Los Angeles, California. From 2019-2021, she was an Arts for Justice Fellow with the University of Arizona Poetry Center, where she dedicated her time to abolitionist groups and efforts, and advocated for migrant mothers, women, children, and incarcerated adolescent girls.

Awards and honors 
 2021 National Endowment for the Arts Creative Writing Fellowship 
 2019-2021 University of Arizona Art for Justice Fellowship
 2019 Whiting Award, Poetry
 2019 Kate Tufts Discovery Award Finalist
 2019 Friends of Literature Prize, POETRY Magazine
 2018 John A. Robertson Award for Best First Book of Poetry, Texas Institute of Letters

Works 
 Beast Meridian (Noemi Press, Akrilica Series, 2017) 
 Best American Experimental Writing 2020 (Wesleyan University Press, 2020) 
 Embodied: An Intersectional Feminist Comics Poetry Anthology (A Wave Blue World Inc, 2021)

References

External links 

 Official website
 Vanessa Angélica Villarreal reads "First Estrangement" Ours Poetica, Jun 15, 2020

Year of birth missing (living people)
Living people
American poets of Mexican descent

American poets
American LGBT poets
American writers
American essayists
Writers from Texas
Poets from Texas
21st-century American poets
Writers from California
Writers from Los Angeles
Writers from Houston
Chicana feminists
Mexican feminist writers
Immigrant rights activists